Strachkvas (Kristián) (28 September 929 or 935, Prague – 996, Prague) was a prince of Bohemia, son of Boleslav I and brother of Boleslav II, all members of the Přemyslid dynasty. A clergyman, Strachkvas was finally to become Bishop of Prague but died during his consecration.

Life
Strachkvas was born on a feast day on which his father killed his own brother or half-brother, Wenceslaus, in order to replace Wenceslaus as Duke of the Bohemians. Feeling remorse, Boleslav gave his newborn son the strange name of "Strachkvas", "a dreadful feast". Boleslav promised to devote his son to religion and to educate him as a clergyman, and he kept his word.

According to Chronica Boemorum of Cosmas of Prague, Saint Adalbert of Prague in 994 offered his episcopal see to Strachkvas, explaining that Strachkvas came from the Přemyslids, and it would be easy for him to bend people to his will; but Strachkvas refused the episcopacy. When Adalbert's family was massacred the next year and he left Prague, however, Strachkvas was appointed to succeed him. Then, just as Strachkvas was about to assume the episcopate, he died without warning during the installation ceremony itself. The circumstances of his death still are unclear.

10th-century births
996 deaths
Year of birth uncertain
10th-century bishops in Bohemia
Roman Catholic bishops of Prague
Přemyslid dynasty
Bohemian princes
Nobility from Prague